Qaraxanbəyli (also, Karakhanbeyli) is a village in the Fuzuli District of Azerbaijan. Currently uninhabited.

The village was located on the Artsakh side on the cease-fire line between the armed forces of the self-proclaimed Republic of Artsakh (as a part of their Hadrut Province) and those of Azerbaijan. There had been allegations of cease fire violations in the village's vicinity. It was taken back by Azerbaijan Army during Aras Valley campaign on 27 September 2020.

References 

Populated places in Fuzuli District